The George A. Chalker House (also known as the Edinfield House) is a historic house in the Middleburg Historic District, Middleburg, Florida. Located at 2160 Wharf Street, the Edinfield House is the only historic home in the district to not be located on Main Street. 

Built around 1897, it was originally designed in the Folk Victorian style, but was later remodeled to fit the Colonial Revival style that was popular in the early 1900s.

In 1990, it was added to the U.S. National Register of Historic Places.

References

External links
 Clay County listings at Florida's Office of Cultural and Historical Programs

National Register of Historic Places in Clay County, Florida
Houses on the National Register of Historic Places in Florida
Houses in Clay County, Florida
Colonial Revival architecture in Florida
Folk Victorian architecture in the United States
1890s establishments in Florida
Houses completed in the 19th century